Daedeokje is an annual festival held in the city of Daegu in the Nam-gu district, South Korea.  The festival, held every May, consists of a harmony athletic meeting, a contact of Korean classical music and Western music, installation art, guitar concerts, and many more.

See also
List of festivals in South Korea
List of festivals in Asia

References

External links

Arts festivals in South Korea
Tourist attractions in Daegu
Annual events in South Korea
Music festivals in South Korea
Classical music festivals in South Korea
Spring (season) events in South Korea